Platanthera sparsiflora is a species of orchid known by the common name sparse-flowered bog orchid. It is native to the forests and meadows of the western United States (Colorado and New Mexico west to California, plus Washington and Oregon), and also south to Baja California.

Platanthera sparsiflora can be found in wet habitats.

References

External links 

 Jepson Manual Treatment
 Photo gallery

sparsiflora
Orchids of the United States
Orchids of Mexico
Plants described in 1877